Charles Talbot may refer to:
Charles Talbot, 1st Baron Talbot (1685–1737), British lawyer and politician
Charles Talbot, 1st Duke of Shrewsbury (1660–1718), English statesman
Charles Talbot Foxcroft (1868–1929), British Conservative Party politician
Charles Talbot (Royal Navy officer) (1801–1876), British admiral
Charles Talbot (priest) (1769–1823), English churchman
Charles John Talbot (1873–1942), Liberal Party Member of Parliament in New Zealand
Sir Charles Talbot, 2nd Baronet (1751–1812), British politician